Free Love is the third studio album by American indie pop duo Sylvan Esso, made up of singer Amelia Meath and multi-instrumentalist Nick Sanborn, released on September 25, 2020, by Loma Vista Recordings.

In a September 25, 2020 live listening party on NPR Music, the band stated that the album cover photo is of Nick leaning out of a Koreatown window observing the October 2019 Saddleridge Fire.

In lieu of a large album release party, the band hosted a multimedia art project on their website. The project included a video with a 20 minute improvised modular set by Nick (sampling from the album), interviews with music video directors, various art pieces by Nathaniel Russell, an improvised dance by Emma Portner to "Numb", a song dedicated to the band by Jeff Tweedy and a DJ set by Merrill Garbus of tUnE-yArDs.

Track listing

Personnel
Sylvan Esso
 Amelia Meath – vocals, production, engineering, cover photo
 Nick Sanborn – guitar, keyboards, percussion, programming, production, engineering, lettering

Additional personnel
 Joe Westerlund – drums, voices (2)
 Homer Steinweiss – drums (8)
 Stephen Sanborn – guitar (9)
 Daniel Kyriakides – guitar (9)
 John Hill – production (3)
 Huntley Miller – mastering
 BJ Burton – mixing
 Christopher Leckie – art direction, design

Charts

References

2020 albums
Sylvan Esso albums
Loma Vista Recordings albums